is a Japanese former sprinter who specialised in the 200 metres. She represented her country at three outdoor and one indoor World Championships. She held the national records in the 200 metres (23.33 seconds), the 4 × 100 metres relay (43.67 seconds) and the 4 × 400 metres relay (3:33.06 minutes).

International competitions

National titles
Japanese Championships
100 m: 2006
200 m: 2004, 2005, 2006, 2007, 2008
4 × 100 m relay: 1998, 1999

Personal bests
Outdoor
100 metres – 11.47 (Azusa 2006)
200 metres – 23.33 (+0.4 m/s, Tottori 2004)
400 metres – 54.64 (Yokohama 2001)
Indoor
200 metres – 24.51 (Yokohama 2002)
400 metres – 54.11 (Maebashi 1999)

References

External links

All-Athletics profile (archived)
Sakie Nobuoka at JAAF 
Sakie Nobuoka at Mizuno  (archived)
2005 World Championships profile at TBS  (archived)
2007 World Championships profile at TBS  (archived)

1977 births
Living people
Sportspeople from Yamaguchi Prefecture
Japanese female sprinters
Asian Games silver medalists for Japan
Asian Games medalists in athletics (track and field)
Athletes (track and field) at the 1998 Asian Games
Athletes (track and field) at the 2006 Asian Games
Medalists at the 2006 Asian Games
World Athletics Championships athletes for Japan
Japan Championships in Athletics winners